Mary Duffy Messier (born June 27, 1952) is an American politician and a Democratic member of the Rhode Island House of Representatives representing District 62 since her December 2009 special election to fill the vacancy caused by the resignation of Representative Elizabeth Dennigan.

Education
Messier earned her BA degree from Roger Williams University, and her MEd from Rhode Island College.

Elections
2012 Messier was unopposed for both the September 11, 2012 Democratic Primary, winning with 1,075 votes and the November 6, 2012 General election, winning with 4,149 votes.
2010 Messier was unopposed for the September 23, 2010 Democratic Primary, winning with 1,488 votes and won the November 2, 2010 General election with 2,615 votes (68.3%) against Republican nominee Thomas Clupny.

References

External links
Official page at the Rhode Island General Assembly

Mary Messier at Ballotpedia
Mary Duffy Messier at OpenSecrets

Place of birth missing (living people)
1952 births
Living people
Democratic Party members of the Rhode Island House of Representatives
Politicians from Pawtucket, Rhode Island
Rhode Island College alumni
Roger Williams University alumni
Women state legislators in Rhode Island
21st-century American politicians
21st-century American women politicians